Thyreus abdominalis is a species of bee belonging to the genus Thyreus, the members of which are often referred to as cuckoo bees. Like all bees in this genus, it is cleptoparasitic. It is found throughout southern and eastern Asia.

Range
T. abdominalis is widespread, having been recorded throughout the Himalayan states to eastern China, Malaysia, and Indonesia.

Taxonomy
There are four subspecies of T. abdominalis. These are:

 T.abdominalis abdominalis
 T. abdominalis austrosunsanus
 T. abdominalis rostratus
 T. abdominalis simulator

References

Apinae
Hymenoptera of Asia